Tetracha angustata is a species of tiger beetle in the subfamily Cicindelinae that was described by Chevrolat in 1841.

References

Beetles described in 1841
Cicindelidae